These are the official results of the men's 10 km sprint event at the Biathlon World Championships 2009 in Pyeongchang, South Korea.

Men's Sprint